Huntsman is a surname. Notable people with the surname include:

Abby Huntsman (born 1986), American television personality
Archibald Gowanlock Huntsman (1883-1973), Canadian scientist
Benjamin Huntsman, 18th-century English inventor
John A. Huntsman, decorated 19th-century American soldier
Jon Huntsman Jr. (born 1960), former U.S. ambassador to China and former candidate for the 2012 Republican presidential nomination
Jon Huntsman Sr. (1937-2018), philanthropist and Chairman of Huntsman Corporation
Mary Kaye Huntsman (born 1961), American activist
Peter Huntsman, CEO of Huntsman Corporation
Robert Huntsman (born 1955), American lawyer

English-language surnames
Occupational surnames
English-language occupational surnames